Robbers Roost was a hideout of Butch Cassidy and other outlaws in Utah.

Robbers Roost or Robber's Roost may also refer to:

Robbers Roost (Kern County, California)
Robbers Roost (Alder, Montana), listed on the NRHP in Montana
Robbers Roost Canyon, a tributary of the Dirty Devil River, in Utah, named after the hideout
Robbers' Roost (1932 film), a Western
Robbers' Roost (1955 film), a Western